Dana Rosendorff (born in Perth, Western Australia) is an Australian actress.

Rosendorff was born in Perth, the daughter of the founder of Rosendorff Diamond Jewellers.

After relocating to Los Angeles, Rosendorff appeared in Australian comedy Bitter Art.

In 2016 Rosendorff starred opposite Mischa Barton as her estranged best friend Heather in the feature film Deserted.

References

External links

Living people
Actresses from Perth, Western Australia
Australian film actresses
Tisch School of the Arts alumni
Australian television actresses
Year of birth missing (living people)